Goose River may refer to:

 in The Bahamas
 Goose River (Bahamas)

 in Canada
 Goose River (Manitoba-Saskatchewan), a river mostly in Manitoba with a mouth in Saskatchewan
Prince Edward Island
 Goose River, Prince Edward Island, a community in Kings County
Goose River (Kings County), a short river in Kings County in the community of the same name

in Russia
Gus River, (Russian: Гусь, lit. Goose), a river in Vladimir and Ryazan Oblasts

in the United States
Maine
Goose River (Belfast Bay), a river in Waldo County
Goose River (Medomak River), a river in Lincoln and Knox Counties
Goose River (Rockport Harbor), a river in Knox County
Goose River (North Dakota), a river in Grand Forks County and Traill County of North Dakota

See also
Goose River Bank, a bank in Mayville, North Dakota
Goose River Bridge (Hillsboro, North Dakota), a bridge over the Goose River (North Dakota)